Isle of Meadows is a  uninhabited island in the New York City borough of Staten Island in the United States. It is located along the western side of Staten Island, where Fresh Kills empties into the Arthur Kill. The island is owned by the city of New York. It is now a nature preserve providing important meadow and salt marsh nesting habitat for herons, ibises, and egrets, and is not open to the public.

References 

Islands of New York City
Protected areas of Staten Island
Uninhabited islands of New York (state)
Islands of Staten Island